is a Japanese tokusatsu comedy drama based on the Super Sentai Series. It is not part of the official line up in Toei Company's Super Sentai franchise, but is instead a self-parody geared towards adults who were fans of the franchise as children. The show aired on BS Asahi (TV Asahi's broadcast satellite channel) starting April 6, 2012, and Tokyo MX starting April 9, 2012.

A second season was officially announced in January 2013 at a teaser event tying in with the final appearances of the characters from Tokumei Sentai Go-Busters, featuring Masato Wada, who performs as main character Nobuo Akagi. The second season is titled  and premiered on April 5, 2013.

Plot

Three individuals (a Super Sentai otaku, a cosplay otaku, and a closet anime otaku) are chosen by a beautiful scientist otaku to become the "Unofficial Sentai Akibaranger" and "protect Akihabara" from powerful otaku villains that only exist in their delusions. However, the otaku fight eventually gets literally real when their "otaku enemies" begin to materialize in the real world.

Episodes

Web radio series
On July 6, Animate.tv started broadcasting . The bi-weekly web radio series is hosted by Masato Wada, who plays Nobuo Akagi in the TV series. Other cast members from the series, as well as voice actors from other Super Sentai series, make guest appearances.

Cast

 : 
 :  (Season 1)
 :  (Season 2)
 /: 
 /,  (Voice): 
 : 
 :  (Season 1)
 : 
 :  (Season 1)
 : 
 :  (Season 1)
 :  (Season 2)
 :

Guest stars

Season One
 Himself, Deka Red (Banban "Ban" Akaza, Voice): 
 Bouken Red (Satoru Akashi, Voice): 
 Customer at Café: 
 Masako Yamada: 
 Himself: 
 Customer at Café: 
 Staff of Animation Studio: 
 Guard at Toei: 
 Producer Tsukada (Voice): 
 Café maids: Danceroid (9)
 Herself: 
 Himself: 
 Narrator: 
 Mio Usagi: 
Season Two
 Owner of Toy Shop: 
 Male Past Sentai Warriors (Voice), China Red (Voice), Tyrano Ranger (Voice), Hurricane Red (Voiced), Kabuto Raiger (Voice): Tomokazu Seki (1-3, 5, 7, 10)
 Male Past Sentai Warriors (Voice), Dragon Ranger (Voice), Hurricane Yellow (Voice), Kuwaga Raiger (Voice): 
 Female Past Sentai Warriors (Voice), Sanae Yuru (Voice), Hurricane Blue (Voice): 
 Kiba Ranger (Voice): 
 Ryu Ranger (Ryo of the Heavenly Fire Star, Voice): 
 Himself: Yukio Yamagata (3)
 Himself: MoJo (3)
 Yasuko Yokoyama: 
 Akina Maihama: 
 George Spielburton: 
 Himself: 
 Yuru-Chara Jigen (Voice), Herself: Haruko Momoi (6, 10)
 Hadezukin (Voice): 
 Himself: 
 Himself: 
 Customer at Karaoke Box: 
 Nurse Hirata: 
 Prism Ace (Voice):

Staff
 Z-Cune Aoi Character design:

Theme songs

Season 1
Opening theme
 
 Lyrics & Composition: Haruko Momoi
 Arrangement: Hiroaki Kagoshima
 Artist: Haruko Momoi feat. Yukio Yamagata
 Theme of the first season.
Ending theme
 
 Lyrics: Mike Sugiyama
 Composition: EFY
 Arrangement: Makoto Miyazaki
 Artist: Nobuo Akagi (Masato Wada)
 In most episodes, the ending theme features a monologue by a character in the series talking about himself/herself, adding details to their background.

Season 2
Opening theme
 
 Lyrics & Composition: Haruko Momoi
 Arrangement: Hiroaki Kagoshima
 Artist: Haruko Momoi feat. Yukio Yamagata & MoJo
 In episode 1,  of this song sung only by Haruko Momoi is used.
Ending themes
 
 Lyrics: Mike Sugiyama
 Composition: Seiji Miura
 Arrangement: Yasumasa Sato
 Artist: Nobuo Akagi (Masato Wada), Yukio Yamagata, & Mojo
 Episode: 1
 In episode 8,  of this song sung by Nobuo Akagi, Luna Iwashimizu, and Yuko Yokoyama is used. In episode 13, "ver. MAX!!" of this song sung by Nobuo Akagi, Luna Iwashimizu, Yuko Yokoyama, Haruko Momoi, Yukio Yamagata, and MoJo is used.
 
 Lyrics: Keisuke Yamakawa
 Composition: Michiaki Watanabe
 Arrangement: Hisashi Ichi
 Artist: Yuko Yokoyama (Karin Ogino)
 Episode: 2
 Image song from Taiyo Sentai Sun Vulcan covered by Yuko Yokoyama.
 "Go! Love Sick"
 Lyrics: Shoko Fujibayashi
 Composition & Arrangement: Toshihiko Sahashi
 Artist: Luna Iwashimizu (Shione Sawada)
 Episode: 3
 Image song from Kyuukyuu Sentai GoGoFive covered by Luna Iwashimizu.
 
 Lyrics: Saburo Hatte, Ritsuho Urabe
 Composition & Arrangement: Akihiro Komori
 Artist: Etsuko Horimi (Mitsuko Horie)
 Episode: 4
 Song based on the opening theme  of Ninja Captor.
 "girls in trouble! DEKARANGER"
 Lyrics: Shoko Fujibayashi
 Composition: Yūmao
 Arrangement: Yukihiko Nishihata
 Artist: Nobuo Akagi & General Two (Masato Wada & Ryō Horikawa)
 Episode: 5
 Alternate ending theme song from Tokusou Sentai Dekaranger covered by Nobuo Akagi and General Two.
 
 Lyrics: Kazuo Koike
 Composition & Arrangement: Kensuke Kyo
 Artist: Hiroyo Hakase (Maaya Uchida)
 Episode: 6
 The song from Kagaku Sentai Dynaman covered by Hiroyo Hakase.
 
 Lyrics: Shoko Fujibayashi
 Composition & Arrangement: Jack Denyor
 Artist: Luna Iwashimizu, Yuko Yokoyama, Malseena, & Nobuo Akagi (Shione Sawada, Karin Ogino, Honoka, & Masato Wada)
 Episode: 7
 Image song from Samurai Sentai Shinkenger covered by Luna Iwashimizu, Yuko Yokoyama, Malseena, and Nobuo Akagi.
 
 Lyrics: Nagae Kuwahara
 Composition & Arrangement: Kōtarō Nakagawa
 Artist: KozuKozu Mita (Kozue Aikawa)
 Episode: 9
 Image song from Hyakujuu Sentai Gaoranger covered by KozuKozu Mita.
 
 Lyrics: Saburo Yatsude
 Composition & Arrangement: Taka-Tora
 Artist: General Two (Ryō Horikawa)
 Episode: 10
 Ending theme song from Denji Sentai Megaranger covered by General Two.
 
 Lyrics: Kayoko Fuyumori
 Composition & Arrangement: KAZZ TOYAMA
 Artist: Malseena (Honoka)
 Episode: 11
 Image song from Kyōryū Sentai Zyuranger covered by Malseena.
 
 Lyrics: Kazunori Sonobe
 Composition: Takeshi Ike
 Arrangement: Daito Fujita
 Artist: Luna Iwashimizu, Yuko Yokoyama, Hiroyo Hakase, & KozuKozu Mita (Shione Sawada, Karin Ogino, Maaya Uchida, & Kozue Aikawa)
 Episode: 12
 Movie theme song from Hikari Sentai Maskman covered by Luna Iwashimizu, Yuko Yokoyama, Hiroyo Hakase, and KozuKozu Mita.

Notes

References

External links
 Unofficial Sentai Akibaranger official website
 Unofficial Sentai Akibaranger at BS Asahi
 Unofficial Sentai Akibaranger Season 2 at BS Asahi
 Columbia Music Entertainment's official Unofficial Sentai Akibaranger website
 Tamashii Nation's Adult Sentai Tamashii website
 Unofficial Sentai Akibaranger official Hong Kong website 
  (Asia)

2012 Japanese television series debuts
2013 Japanese television series debuts
2012 Japanese television series endings
2013 Japanese television series endings
Super Sentai
Crossover tokusatsu television series
Akihabara
Metafictional television series
Japanese television series with live action and animation